Angelo Sarzetti (1656-1713) was an Italian painter of the Baroque period, active in Rimini. He was a pupil of Carlo Cignani. He painted a San Gaudenzo for the church of San Gaudenzo, Rimini.

References

17th-century Italian painters
Italian male painters
18th-century Italian painters
Italian Baroque painters
1656 births
1713 deaths
18th-century Italian male artists